The South Ural Military District (YuUrVO(ЮУрВО)) was a military administrative division of the Soviet Armed Forces. It existed from 1 December 1941 to 15 January 1958.

History
According to the directive No. 0444 of People's Commissar of Defense of the USSR Josef Stalin on November 26, 1941, established the South Ural Military District in Bashkir, Headquarters of the Military District was in Chkalov, appointed Lieutenant General Vladimir Nikolaevich Kurdyumov as commander. The management of YuUrVO was formed on the basis of Headquarters Orel Military District. The district included the territory of Chkalov Oblast, Bashkir ASSR and West Kazakh (Uralsk Oblast, Guryev Oblast, and Akhtyubinsk Oblast).

The 193rd Rifle Division was reformed at Sorochinsk, within the District's boundaries, from December 1941 to 3 January 1942.

During the Khrushchev reduction of 1958, the South Ural Military District was disbanded, and its territory was assigned to the Volga and the Turkestan Military District.

Commanders
Vladimir Nikolaevich Kurdyumov, Lieutenant-General (November 1941 - January 1942)
Fedor Nikititch Remezov, Lieutenant-General (January - April 1942)
Matvei Timofeevich Popov, Major-General (April 1942 - August 1943)
Nikolai Ivanovich Dementyev, Major-General (August - September 1943)
Max Reyter, Colonel-General (September 1943 - July 1945)
Georgiy Zakharov, General of the Army (July 1945 - April 1946)
Semyon Timoshenko, Marshal of the Soviet Union (April 1946 - March 1949)
Pavel Alekseevich Belov, Colonel-General (March 1949 - May 1955)
Yakov Kreizer, Colonel-General (May 1955 - January 1958)

Notes

Further reading
  Приказ о территориальном составе военных округов Европейской части СССР № 0444, 26 ноября 1941 г.
  Сборник указов, постановлений, решений, распоряжений и приказов военного времени. 1944 г. Л.: Газетно-журнальное и книжное издательство, 1945. 78 с.
  Приказы Верховного Главнокомандующего в период Великой Отечественной войны Светского Союза. М., 1975. 598 с.
  «50 лет Вооруженным Силам СССР», М., 1968
  Великая Отечественная война Советского Союза. 1941—1945. Краткая история. М., 1970. 640 с.
  История Уральского военного округа / под ред. А.А. Егоровского, И.В. Тутаринова. — 1. — Москва: Воениздат, 1970. — 352 с. — 
  «Краснознаменный Приволжский. Исторический очерк»
  «Великая Отечественная война. 1941—1945» четыре тома
  Великая Отечественная война: цифры и факты. Москва, 1995. 321 с.
  Великая Отечественная война, 1941—1945 : энциклопедия / под ред. М. М. Козлова. — Москва : Советская энциклопедия, 1985. — 832 с. — 
  П. Г. Агарышев (под редакцией), сборник-справочник, «Урал ковал победу»

External links
  Сайт Наши песни.
  Сайт Милитера.
  Боевой состав Красной Армии на 1 января 1944 г.
  Сайт Милитера.
  Справочник по истории Коммунистической партии и Советского Союза 1898—1991

Military units and formations established in 1941
Military districts of the Soviet Union
Military units and formations disestablished in 1958